Pamber Green is a hamlet in north Hampshire, England.

Governance
Pamber Green is part of the parish of Pamber, which covers Pamber Heath, Pamber End, Pamber Green and Little London. The parish council meets in Pamber Heath Memorial Hall and St. Stephen's Hall, Little London.

Transport
The village is served by Stagecoach in Hampshire Basingstoke bus route 2.

References

External links

Villages in Hampshire